Cultural y Deportiva Cebrereña is a football team based in Cebreros in the autonomous community of Castile and León. Founded in 1949, it plays in the Tercera División – Group 8. Its stadium is Estadio El Mancho with a capacity of 3,000 seats.

Season to season

9 seasons in Tercera División

References

External links
elportaldelfutbol.es.tl profile
Futbolme.com profile

Football clubs in Castile and León
Association football clubs established in 1949
1949 establishments in Spain
Province of Ávila